The Star Fox video game series is a franchise of rail shooters and other action-adventure games published and produced by Nintendo. The games have been developed by a variety of developers, but all of the games have had input from Nintendo. All Star Fox video games have been developed exclusively for Nintendo video game consoles and handhelds dating from the Super Nintendo Entertainment System to the current generation of video game consoles. The series revolves around the Star Fox team, a group of mercenaries hired to protect the Lylat system. The leader of the group, Fox McCloud, is the protagonist of the series, and the only playable character in most of the games. Currently, the series contains nine games. One reason the Star Fox series has remained popular is because of the shoot 'em up aerial sequences found in many of the games, which are recognized as the series' high points. Dylan Cuthbert, one of the original creators of the series, noted that it was the combination of the on-rails aerial action and the in-game universe that made the games successful.

Video games

Main series

Cancelled titles

Spin-offs

Notes

References

External links
 Official Nintendo website
 Q-Games official site

Star Fox video games
Lists of video games by franchise
Star Fox